Our Miss Brooks is an American sitcom starring Eve Arden as school teacher Connie Brooks, also starring is Gale Gordon, Robert Rockwell, Jane Morgan, Richard Crenna, & Gloria McMillan. The sitcom ran Fridays from October 3. 1952 to May 11, 1956, 130 episodes were made during its run.

Series overview

Episodes

Season 1 (1952-53)

Season 2 (1953–54)

Season 3 (1954–55)

Season 4 (1955–56)

References

External links
 

Lists of American sitcom episodes